Iraqi civil war may refer to:
 Iraqi–Kurdish conflict (1918–2003), wars and rebellions by Iraqi Kurds against the government
 First Iraqi–Kurdish War (1961–70)
 Second Iraqi–Kurdish War (1974–75)
 1991 Iraqi uprisings, rebellions in Iraq during a ceasefire in the Gulf War
 Iraqi Kurdish Civil War (1994–97), a conflict between rival Kurdish factions in Iraqi Kurdistan 
 Iraqi conflict (2003–present). See also:
Iraq War (2003–11), a war that began with the U.S. invasion of Iraq
Iraqi insurgency (2003–2011)
 Occupation of Iraq (2003–2011)
 Iraqi Civil War (2006–2008), a civil war between Sunni and Shia militias including the Iraqi government and Al-Qaeda in Iraq (now known as ISIL)
 Iraqi insurgency (2011–2013), an escalation of insurgent and sectarian violence after the U.S. withdrew
 War in Iraq (2013–2017), a war between ISIL and the Iraqi government and allies
 2017 Iraqi–Kurdish conflict, a short conflict between the Iraqi government and the autonomous Kurdish regional government

See also 
 Iraq War (disambiguation)
 Military history of Iraq
 List of wars involving Iraq